Johann Gottfried Auerbach (28 October 1697 – 5 August 1753) was an Austrian painter and etcher. He painted primarily portraits and battle genre works. Some of his works can be found at the Kunsthistorisches Museum. In 1735, he was appointed Imperial Court Painter by Emperor Charles VI. In 1750, he became a member of the Academy of Fine Arts.

Selected works

Portrait of an Austrian princess
three-quarter-length, in a pink dress embroidered with gold and diamonds, standing beside an electoral crown on a plinth beneath a red curtain. Oil on canvas. 172×126 cm (67-11/16 × 49-5/8 in). PROVENANCE: Purported to have belonged to the Saxe-Coburg family
It has been suggested that the present sitter could be one of the daughters of Joseph I, Holy Roman Emperor, either Maria Josepha (1699−1757) or Maria Amalia (1701−1756).

Portrait of Amalia
Archduchess Maria Amalia, three-quarter-length, in a pink dress embroidered with gold and diamonds, standing beside an electoral crown on a plinth beneath a red curtain. Oil on canvas. Purported to have belonged to the Saxe-Coburg family. The Archduchess (1746−1804) was the daughter of the Austrian Empress, Maria Theresa and sister of Queen Marie Antoinette of France. She became Duchess of Parma.

Portrait of The Empress Maria Theresa
Three-quarter-length, in a silver-embroidered blue dress with lace sleeves and bodice, with an ermine-lined cloth-of-gold cloak, by a table bearing the Imperial regalia on a red cushion.

References

External links

1697 births
1753 deaths
18th-century Austrian painters
18th-century Austrian male artists
Austrian male painters
Austrian portrait painters
Court painters